Chung-Yao Chao (27 June 1902 – 28 May 1998) was a Chinese theoretical physicist. He studied the scattering of gamma rays in lead by pair production in 1930, without knowing that positrons were involved in the anomalously high scattering cross-section. When the positron was discovered by Carl David Anderson in 1932, confirming the existence of Paul Dirac's "antimatter", it became clear that positrons could explain Chung-Yao Chao's earlier experiments, with the gamma rays being emitted from electron-positron annihilation.

He entered Nanjing Higher Normal School (later renamed National Southeastern University, National Central University and Nanjing University), in 1920 and earned a BS in physics in 1925. Then he earned a PhD degree in physics under supervision of Nobel Prize laureate Robert Andrews Millikan at California Institute of Technology in 1930. Later he went back to China and joined the physics faculty of Tsinghua University in Beijing.

Nobel Prize controversy
The 1936 Nobel Prize for Physics went to Carl D. Anderson for the discovery of the positron. While a graduate student at Caltech in 1930, Chao was the first to experimentally identify positrons through electron–positron annihilation, but did not realize what they were. Anderson, Chao's classmate at Caltech, used the same radioactive source, as Chao. (Historically,  was known as "thorium C double prime" or "ThC", see decay chains.) Fifty years later, Anderson admitted that Chao had inspired his discovery: Chao's research formed the foundation from which much of Anderson's own work developed. Chao died in 1998, without sharing in a Nobel Prize acknowledgment.

References

Further reading
 

1902 births
1998 deaths
Boxer Indemnity Scholarship recipients
California Institute of Technology alumni
Educators from Shaoxing
Members of the Chinese Academy of Sciences
Academic staff of the National Central University
Physicists from Zhejiang
Nanjing University alumni
National Central University alumni
Academic staff of the National Southwestern Associated University
Scientists from Shaoxing
Academic staff of Tsinghua University
Academic staff of the University of Science and Technology of China
Academic staff of Yunnan University